It will follow 1429 and 1430 Baṅgābda (Bengali Year).
The year 2023 is the 52nd year of the independence of Bangladesh. It is also the fifth and last year of the fourth cabinet of prime minister Sheikh Hasina and last year of the presidency of Mohammad Abdul Hamid.

Incumbents

National

Current

Former

Legislature

Judiciary 

 Chief Justice – Hasan Foez Siddique (23rd)
 Attorney General – Abu Mohammad Amin Uddin (16th)

Cabinet: Hasina IV

Ministers

Ministers of State

Deputy Ministers

Events

January 
 2-5 January – Cold wave starts to sweep Bangladesh, mainly in the northern and western parts of the country. As the average temperature drops more than recent years, sufferings for common people increase.
 3 January – Md. Mahbub Hossain gets appointed as the 24th Cabinet Secretary of Bangladesh after his predecessor Kabir Bin Anwar went into Post Retirement Leave serving for the shortest period of time as Cabinet Secretary of Bangladesh.
 4 January – By-election held in Gaibandha-5 parliamentary constituency to elect the MP for the vacant seat after being postponed by the Election Commission (EC) for 'mass irregularities', Awami League (AL)-backed candidate Mahmud Hasan Ripon wins in a landslide margin amid low voter-turnout due to cold wave.
 6 January – The main stage of Chhatra League (BSL)'s (AL's student wing) diamond jubilee (75th anniversary) program collapses due to overcrowding while AL's general-secretary Obaidul Quader was giving his speech, injuring 5. The incident becomes a troll-topic and circulates in social media platforms, while opposition politicians warn the ruling party of 'collapsing from their power', indicating to the incident.
 14 January – US Secretary of State for South and Central Asian Affairs Donald Lu visits Bangladesh as part of his South Asia trip. In the highest ranking US official visit since the US sanction over Rapid Action Battalion (RAB) in 2021, topics like democracy, election, labor and human rights issues is discussed among top officials. Lu expresses his satisfaction over the tremendous progress of RAB in the matter of reducing extrajudicial killings (The Daily Star).
 15 January – Veteran AL politician Begum Matia Chowdhury gets appointed and welcomed as the Deputy Leader of the House by Members of the Parliament as the post was vacant for months following the death of Syeda Sajeda Chowdhury.
 19 January – Country's first ever posthumous organ transplantation takes place on BSMMU. Two kidneys and two corneas of 20-year-old Sarah Islam who was declared brain dead, are transplanted to four individual patients.
 25 January – Pallabi Metro Station under the MRT Line-6 opens for commuters, becoming the third metro station of Dhaka Metro Rail to open.

February 
 1 February – By-elections are held in six constituencies which felt vacant after the resignation of Bangladesh Nationalist Party (BNP) lawmakers. AL-backed candidates win in every constituencies except one amid "voter-drought".
 2 February –
 Prime Minister Sheikh Hasina inaugurates the construction programme of the first underground railway project in the country.
 Bangladesh gets the first installment of IMF's loan.
13 February:  2023 Bangladeshi presidential election:  Shahabuddin Chuppu is declared the winner, being the only candidate.
14–22 February – Tagore sculpture controversy
18 February – Uttara Center metro station opened.
19 February – 2023 Gulshan fire.

March 
 1 March – Mirpur 10 metro station opened.
 4 March – Six people are killed and several others are injured in a fire and subsequent explosion at an oxygen plant in Sitakunda.
 5 March – 2023 Kutupalong refugee camp fire: More than 2,000 shelters are destroyed in a fire in the world's largest refugee camp.
 7 March – 2023 Gulistan explosion: At least 18 people are killed and more than 140 others are injured by an explosion at a commercial seven-story building in Gulistan, Dhaka.

Deaths

January 

 2 January – Mubasshar Hussein, 80, architect, sports organizer and freedom fighter.
 7 January – Habib Ullah Khan, 87, politician and diplomat, former minister of Information (1970s) and Jute (1980s), former member of the Jatiya Sangsad (1979–1982), Myocardial infarction.
 11 January – Mohammad Enamul Haque Zoj Miah, 83, two-times former member of the Jatiya Sangsad (1986–1991), known for living like a pauper in his last years.
 12 January – 
Muhammad Delwar Hossain, 67, Bargunaiya politician, former member of the Jatiya Sangsad (2001–2006), Kidney disease.
Mozammel Haque, 68, BNP politician, former member of the Jatiya Sangsad (2001–2006), Cardiac arrest.
 27 January – Mufti Shahidul Islam, 63, Islamist politician, former member of the Jatiya Sangsad (2002–2006).

February 
 6 February – Moslem Uddin Ahmad, 76, AL politician, member of the Jatiya Sangsad (2020–2023).
 13 February – Reza Ali, 82, businessman, AL politician, former member of the Jatiya Sangsad (2009–2014).
 19 February – Nazmul Huda, 80, Bar-at-law and politician, former minister of Information (1991–1996) and Communication (2001–2006), 4-terms former member of the Jatiya Sangsad (1991–2008).

See also

Country overviews
 History of Bangladesh
 Outline of Bangladesh
 Government of Bangladesh
 Politics of Bangladesh
 Timeline of Bangladeshi history
 Years in Bangladesh

References 

 
Bangladesh
Bangladesh
2020s in Bangladesh
Years of the 21st century in Bangladesh